The 25th Independent Spirit Awards, honoring the best independent films of 2009, were presented on March 5, 2010. The nominations were announced on December 1, 2009. The ceremony was hosted by Eddie Izzard.

Winners and nominees

{| class="wikitable"
!Best Feature
!Best Director
|-
| Precious
 (500) Days of Summer
 Amreeka
 The Last Station
 Sin nombre
| Lee Daniels – Precious
 Joel Coen and Ethan Coen – A Serious Man
 Cary Joji Fukunaga – Sin nombre
 James Gray – Two Lovers
 Michael Hoffman – The Last Station
|-
!Best Male Lead
!Best Female Lead
|-
| Jeff Bridges – Crazy Heart
 Colin Firth – A Single Man
 Joseph Gordon-Levitt – (500) Days of Summer
 Souléymane Sy Savané – Goodbye Solo
 Adam Scott – The Vicious Kind
| Gabourey Sidibe – Precious
 Maria Bello – Downloading Nancy
 Nisreen Faour – Amreeka
 Helen Mirren – The Last Station
 Gwyneth Paltrow – Two Lovers
|-
!Best Supporting Male
!Best Supporting Female
|-
| Woody Harrelson – The Messenger
 Jemaine Clement – Gentlemen Broncos
 Christian McKay – Me and Orson Welles
 Ray McKinnon – That Evening Sun
 Christopher Plummer – The Last Station
| Mo'Nique – Precious
 Dina Korzun – Cold Souls
 Samantha Morton – The Messenger
 Natalie Press – Fifty Dead Men Walking
 Mia Wasikowska – That Evening Sun
|-
!Best Screenplay
!Best First Screenplay
|-
| Scott Neustadter and Michael H. Weber – (500) Days of Summer
 Alessandro Camon and Oren Moverman – The Messenger
 Michael Hoffman – The Last Station
 Lee Toland Krieger – The Vicious Kind
 Greg Mottola – Adventureland
| Geoffrey Fletcher – Precious
 Sophie Barthes – Cold Souls
 Scott Cooper – Crazy Heart
 Cherien Dabis – Amreeka
 Tom Ford and David Scearce – A Single Man
|-
!Best First Feature
!Best Documentary
|-
| Crazy Heart
 Easier with Practice
 The Messenger
 Paranormal Activity
 A Single Man
| Anvil! The Story of Anvil
 Food, Inc.
 More than a Game
 October Country
 Which Way Home
|-
!Best Cinematography
!Best Foreign Film
|-
| Roger Deakins – A Serious Man
 Adriano Goldman – Sin nombre
 Anne Misawa – Treeless Mountain
 Andrij Parekh – Cold Souls
 Peter Zeitlinger – Bad Lieutenant: Port of Call New Orleans
| An Education • France / UK Everlasting Moments • Sweden
 The Maid • Chile
 Mother • South Korea
 A Prophet • France
|}

Films with multiple nominations and awards

Special awards

John Cassavetes AwardHumpday
 Big Fan
 The New Year Parade
 Treeless Mountain
 Zero Bridge

Truer Than Fiction Award
45365
 Beetle Queen Conquers Tokyo
 El General

Piaget Producers Award
Karin Chien – The Exploding Girl and Santa Mesa
 Larry Fessenden – The House of the Devil and I Sell the Dead
 Dia Sokol Savage – Beeswax and Nights and Weekends

Someone to Watch Award
Kyle Patrick Alvarez – Easier with Practice
 Asiel Norton – Redland
 Tariq Tapa – Zero Bridge

Robert Altman Award
 A Serious Man – Ethan Coen, Joel Coen, Ellen Chenoweth, Rachel Tenner, Richard Kind, Sari Lennick, Jessica McManus, Fred Melamed, Michael Stuhlbarg, and Aaron Wolff

References

External links
 2010 Awards at IMDb
 Official ceremony at YouTube

2009
Independent Spirit Awards